Tarryn Aiken (born 14 July 1999) is an Australian rugby league footballer who plays as a  for the Brisbane Broncos in the NRL Women's Premiership and the Tweed Heads Seagulls in the QRL Women's Premiership. 

She is an Australian 9s and Queensland representative.

Background
Born in Gosford, New South Wales, Aiken played junior rugby league for the Wyong Roos before moving to the Gold Coast, Queensland.

Playing career

2019
An Australian touch football representative, Aiken joined the Tweed Heads Seagulls in 2019 and later that year represented South East Queensland at the NRL Women's National Championship. In June 2019, Aiken signed with the Brisbane Broncos NRL Women's Premiership side.

In Round 1 of the 2019 NRL Women's Premiership, Aiken made her debut for the Broncos in a 14–4 win over the St George Illawarra Dragons. On 6 October 2019, she came off the bench in the Broncos' 30–6 Grand Final win over the Dragons.

In October 2019, she represented Australia at the World Cup 9s tournament. On 2 December 2019, she was named in the Queensland Performance Program squad in preparation for the 2020 State of Origin game.

2020

Following the game, she was awarded the Nellie Doherty Medal for Player of the Match. On 27 November, she won the Broncos' Players' Player award for the 2020 season.

2022
In late September, Aiken was named in the Dream Team announced by the Rugby League Players Association. The team was selected by the players, who each cast one vote for each position.

Achievements and accolades

Individual
Nellie Doherty Medal: 2020
Brisbane Broncos Players' Player: 2020

Team
2019 NRLW Grand Final: Brisbane Broncos – Winners
2020 NRLW Grand Final: Brisbane Broncos – Winners

References

External links
Brisbane Broncos profile

1999 births
Living people
Rugby league players from Gosford, New South Wales
Australian female rugby league players
Rugby league halfbacks
Rugby league five-eighths
Rugby league locks
Brisbane Broncos (NRLW) players
Rugby league players from New South Wales